Meseret Mebrate (Amharic: መሰረት መብራቴ) is an Ethiopian actress. She debuted by starring the 2002 film Gudifecha and continued acting in various films and television dramas. She was known for acting in television drama Gebena (2009) and Dana (2013).

Life and career
Meseret Mebrate was born in Addis Ababa in a place of Ghibi Gabriel. She was raised by her parents. She studied at Addis Ababa University and debuted film at the of 18. Later, she starred in various TV dramas and movies such as Gudifecha (2002), and the most well-known one is Gebena (2009) and Dana (2013).

In April 2018, Meseret married to Zewdu Shibabaw, a brother of Ethiopian singer Egigayehu Shibabaw (Gigi). She told in Seifu on EBS in 2022 that she was 4 months pregnant.

Filmography

References

External links
 Meseret Mebrate on Yageru

Ethiopian film actresses
Year of birth missing (living people)
Living people
21st-century Ethiopian actresses